Korean Chemical Society was founded on July 7, 1946. It is a non-profit corporation that aims a contribution toward a chemical scholarship, technological development, education, education, and the spread of chemical knowledge. There are about 7,000 members active around university, laboratories, industry, and schools, and there are about 140 organization and about 30 special member companies participating in KCS.

Introduction 
KCS has steering committee, including 12 branches, 12 departments, 3 editing committee, and board of trustees.
KCS publishes journals including “The Journal of Korean Chemical Society”, “Bulletin of Korean Chemical Society” (english, monthly, SCI since 1981), “Chemistry: An Asian Journal”, “Physical Chemistry Chemical Physics”, and “ChemWorld”, the newsletter of KCS.
Korean Chemical Society continuously works with other international chemical societies. KCS is also a member organization of IUPAC and FACS.

Bulletin of Korean Chemical Society
Bulletin of Korean Chemical Society is a flagship journal of KCS representing basic and applied chemical science. It appeals to broad international readership in the chemical community.
As an official journal of KCS, it reaches out to the chemical community worldwide. It is strictly peer-reviewed and welcomes papers written in English.
The Bull. Korean Chem. Soc. Is jointly published with Wiley-VCH. It is read by chemist of all disciplines.
This journal is on a SCI index. It means that this journal is globally recognized,

Events 
KCS holds annual meetings and several conferences. KCS also hosts KChO, the Korean Chemistry Olympiad. KChO is a well-known chemistry competition in Korea. KChO is also a team selection test of Korean team in IChO. KChO is composed of two summer schools and two winter schools. Every high school students (starting at 16 yr) can participate in school entering exam. After entering seasonal schools, students get lesson from professors and takes exam. Also, there are experimental test in seasonal schools. For further information, visit Korean Chemistry Olympiad. This is a part of Chemical Education and Outreach Program. Also, compiling chemical terms and nomenclature of chemical compounds in Korean is another part of this program, which KCS do as a national affiliated organization of the IUPAC.

Furthermore, in Science day of Korea, April 21, which was designated in 1967 by government, KCS holds “Contest for Chemical Poetry and Painting” for secondary school students, and “Contest for Chemical Poster” for elementary school and secondary school students. Award-winning works can be searched from http://new.kcsnet.or.kr/contest_poem_result.
 
KCS established “Carbon Culture Award” in 2012 to recognize and understand the importance of the Carbon.

Awards

External links 
 The Korean Chemical Society English Website
 SCI Index

Chemistry societies
1946 establishments in Korea
Scientific organizations established in 1946
Scientific organizations based in South Korea